The 1997–98 Estonian Cup was the eighth season of the Estonian main domestic football knockout tournament. Flora won their second cup after defeating Lantana in the final.

First preliminary round

All matches were played on 21 August 1997.

Second preliminary round

All matches were played on 3 September 1997.

Round of 32

All matches were played on 17 September 1997.

Round of 16

All matches were played on 1 October 1997.

Quarter-finals

The first legs were played on 22 April 1998 and the second legs were played on 6 May 1998.

Flora won 12–0 on aggregate.

Lantana won 2–0 on aggregate.

Viljandi Tulevik won 4–3 on aggregate.

Narva Trans won 7–3 on aggregate.

Semi-finals

The first legs were played on 20 May 1998 and the second legs were played on 24 May 1998.

Flora won 3–1 on aggregate.

Lantana won 7–0 on aggregate.

Final

The final took place on 20 June 1998 in Kuressaare. Flora won a double after also winning the 1997–98 Meistriliiga.

References 

Estonian Cup seasons
1997 in Estonian football
1998 in Estonian football
1997–98 in European football